Egira crucialis is a species of cutworm or dart moth in the family Noctuidae. It is found in North America.

The MONA or Hodges number for Egira crucialis is 10508.

References

Further reading

 
 
 

Orthosiini
Articles created by Qbugbot
Moths described in 1875